Yelenika, also known as Yeleninsky and Yeleninskoye, is a rural locality (a selo) in Kartalinsky District of Chelyabinsk Oblast, Russia.

It is the birthplace of Vasily Zaytsev, the famous World War II Soviet sniper.

Rural localities in Chelyabinsk Oblast